Vladislav is a male given name of Slavic origin.

Vladislav may also refer to:

Places
 Vladislav (Třebíč District), a market town in the Czech Republic

See also
 Vladislavci, a municipality in Osijek-Baranja county, Croatia
 Władysławowo, a town in Poland